Membrane bound O-acyltransferase domain containing 2 is a protein that in humans is encoded by the MBOAT2 gene.

References

Further reading